Arhaan Behll is an Indian television actor, who rose to fame playing Krishna Singh Thakur in Star Plus' Mann Kee Awaaz Pratigya. He then hosted Fear Factor India and starred in Do Dil Bandhe Ek Dori Se, Vish Ya Amrit: Sitara and Yehh Jadu Hai Jinn Ka!. In 2021, he reprised his role as Krishna Singh Thakur in Star Bharat's Mann Kee Awaaz Pratigya 2.

Television

Awards

References

External links

Living people
People from Rajasthan
Indian male television actors
Indian male soap opera actors
21st-century Indian male actors
Punjabi people
Year of birth missing (living people)